Patrick Van Horn (born March 17, 1969) is an American actor. He is best known for his role as Sue in the 1996 film Swingers, starring alongside real-life friends Jon Favreau, Vince Vaughn and Ron Livingston.

He had previously appeared in the Dirty Harry film The Dead Pool (1988), in the Pauly Shore comedy Encino Man (1992), and on the TV series The Fresh Prince of Bel-Air in 1990. From 1992 to 1993 he hosted the series I Witness Video.

After Swingers he had roles in the 1999 films Three to Tango and Free Enterprise, and 2008's Four Christmases which reunited him with his Swingers co-stars Vaughn and Favreau.

Filmography
 The Dead Pool (1988)
 Encino Man (1992)
 Swingers (1996)
 Three to Tango (1999)
 Free Enterprise (1999)
 Four Christmases (2008)

References

External links 

 

1969 births
Living people
American male film actors
20th-century American male actors
21st-century American male actors